Neopolynoe antarctica is a scale worm known from the Magallanes Region of the South Atlantic Ocean and from the Southern Ocean south of New Zealand at depths to about 200 m.

Description
Neopolynoe antarctica has up to 86 segments with 15 pairs of elytra. There is a grayish-brown ovate ring and faint spots along the dorsum with the rings also on the dorsal cirri and antennae. The prostomium has a pair of acute anterior projections on its anterior margin and the lateral antennae are inserted beneath (ventrally) it. The notochaetae are distinctly thicker than the neurochaetae and possess bidentate tips.

Biology
Neopolynoe antarctica has a commensal relationship with other tube-building polychaetes, with them hosting N. antarctica inside their tubes. Other host taxa include hydroids of the genus Thuiaria.

References

Phyllodocida